The Minardi M185 was a Formula One car, designed for Minardi by Giacomo Caliri for use in the  season. For the following season, it was updated to a M185B specification. It was an unreliable car and only finished three races and did not score any points for the team.

Development
Giancarlo Minardi had run teams in Formula Two for several seasons before turning his attention to Formula One and forming a team to enter the  season. Giacomo Caliri was tasked with the design of the team's new car, designated the Minardi M185 and which was intended to be powered by Motori Moderni 615-90 turbocharged engines. However, the engines were not ready in time for the first two races of the year. The first M185 chassis was modified to accept a Ford Cosworth DFY through the use of a spacer between the engine and gearbox. A total of four M185 chassis were built during the year.

The M185 was updated by Caliri for the  season and was designated the Minardi M185B. A major change, to comply with new regulations, was a reduction in the size of the fuel tank, from the 220-litre tank of 1985 to 195-litres.  The front track was also reduced fractionally.

Race history
The team only raced a single entry throughout 1985, which was driven by the young Italian, Pierluigi Martini. He qualified for all but one race of the season, but usually on the back two rows of the grid. He failed to make the grid at the Monaco Grand Prix. Reliability was a problem and Martini was also involved in a number of accidents. Only two finishes were recorded all year, the best being 8th at the Australian Grand Prix. Martini was also classified in 11th at the German Grand Prix although not running at the finish.

Minardi expanded to a two car entry for 1986. Martini left the team, and in his place the experienced Andrea de Cesaris was hired. For the first nine races of the year, de Cesaris drove the M185B before switching to the team's new car, the Minardi M186, from Hungary. No finishes were recorded by de Cesaris with the M185B, and he failed to qualify at Monaco. In the second car, Alessandro Nannini was brought in to make his debut in Formula One. Nannini campaigned the M185B for the entire season. Like the previous season, reliability was poor and only one finish was achieved. This was 14th, in Mexico. Nannini achieved the best grid position for the M185B with 17th, at Hungary.  Like de Cesaris, he failed to make the grid at Monaco.

Livery 
The M185 featured a black and yellow livery with prominent sponsorship from Italian companies Simod and Gilmar.

Complete Formula One results
(key) (Results in bold indicate pole position; results in italics indicate fastest lap.) 

* not running at finish

Notes

References

Minardi Formula One cars